The 1991 Mr. Olympia contest was an IFBB professional bodybuilding competition held in September. The winner of this contest was  Lee Haney.

Results

The total prize money awarded was $250,000.

Notable events

Lee Haney won his eighth and final Mr. Olympia title, announces his retirement

References

External links 
 Mr. Olympia
 1991 Mr. Olympia Top Six Posedown

 1991
1991 in American sports
1991 in bodybuilding